Lakes of the lower Turgay and Irgiz is a protected area in the Turgay Depression, Kazakhstan. Administratively it is located in the Yrgyz District of the Aktobe Region.

Description
It lies in the basins of rivers Turgay, its tributary Irgyz, and the Ulkayak, whose riverbeds usually dry up in summer. 
The area includes a number of lakes of different origins, many of which are salty. The lakes are roughly aligned in a SW / NE direction, such as the Kyzylkol, Ayrkol, Baitakkol, Kogakol, Zharkol, Zharmakol, Zharkamys, Keltekol, Shuzhyk, Karmakkol, Kogakol, Karpykkol, Maikol, Aidarkol and Aikol. The Saryozek river flows from lake Bokenkol.

In 1976 it was recognized as a Ramsar site. The area is part of the Kazakh semi-desert ecoregion.

Ecology
The Irgiz-Turgay Lakes is an Important Bird Area. The landscape surrounding the lakes is mostly semi-desert. More than 100 different waterbird species, have been recorded, with up to 250,000 individuals in the area at one time. Between two and three million birds fly over the lakes in spring and autumn.

See also
List of lakes of Kazakhstan
List of Ramsar Wetlands of International Importance

References

External links
Kazakhstan: Government Expands Protection Of Steppes
Тайны Иргиз-Тургая - Казахстанская правда
Ramsar sites in Kazakhstan
Protected areas of Kazakhstan
Important Bird Areas of Kazakhstan
Lake groups of Kazakhstan